Govt. Fazlul Huq College is a public institution for higher education in Chakhar, a small town in Barisal district in Bangladesh. It was founded in 1940 by then Prime Minister of Bengal A K Fazlul Huq with a view to creating opportunity of higher education to underprivileged students in rural areas. It offers Higher Secondary School Certificate (HSC), as well as 3 years degree(pass) courses and 4 years honours programs which divisions are affiliated to the National University, Bangladesh. It is the second oldest and largest college in Barisal division and was previously affiliated with University of Calcutta before partition and University of Dhaka after formation of Pakistan and Bangladesh respectively.

History
Chakhar is a prominent village town in Barisal district best known for the parental home of the Sher-e-Bangla A.K. Fazlul Huq. It's located about 16 miles to the north-west of the district headquarter and administrated under Chakhar union of Banaripara sub district. It is also home of some aristocratic Muslim families and Zammindars of Mughal era. The Zamindars were reported to have been entrusted with some revenue powers, especially collection of Chouth, i.e. chau-kar from which probably the name Chakhar originated.

During the early 1930s, Huq bequeathed his entire homestead and other ancestral properties at Chakhar for the interest of education. Chakhar, also patronised and inspired by him, gradually became an important centre of culture and education.

In 1940, Fazlul Huq College was established as a degree college at Chakhar. He also founded a high school, known as Chakhar Fazlul Huq Institution for boys (Multilateral) and the another for girls known as Wazed Memorial Girls High School. Huq himself also established a public library, a reading hall, a rural reconstruction society, a boys' club and a rural hospital in the village.

The college was nationalized in 1978 by the Government of Bangladesh.

Library
The central library of Dhaka College was established in 1940 at the time of establishment of the college. It has a collection of 10,000 books sponsored by A K Fazlul Huq himself.

Academics
Fazlul Huq College offers H.S.C.under the Barisal education Board, 3 years degree courses and four years Honours programs in Nine Important Subject under National University,Bangladesh 

For HSC Level ↓
 Science
 Business Studies
 Humanities

For Degree (Pass) Level ↓
 B.A.  (Pass)
 B.Sc. (Pass)
 B.B.S.(Pass)

For Honours Level ↓

 Department of Bangla
 Department of English
 Department of History
 Department of Islamic history and culture
 Department of Philosophy
 Department of Political Science
 Department of Economics
 Department of Accounting
 Department of Management

References

External links
Official website

Colleges in Barisal District
Universities and colleges in Barisal District
1940 establishments in British India
Academic institutions associated with the Bengal Renaissance
Educational institutions established in 1940